The Ngumpin–Yapa a.k.a. Ngarrka–Ngumpin languages are a family of Pama–Nyungan languages of the Pilbara region of Australia.

Ngarrga languages (Yapa: Warlmanpa and Warlpiri)
Ngumbin languages (Walmajarri, Djaru, Gurindji and Mudburra)

Ngardi, once classified as either Ngarrga (2002) or Ngumpin (2004), has been reassigned to the Wati languages.

Vocabulary
Capell (1940) lists the following basic vocabulary items for the Ngumpin–Yapa languages:

{| class="wikitable sortable"
! gloss !! Wolmeri !! Jülbre !! Djäru (Southern) !! Malngin !! Ngaɽinman !! Mudbura !! Gogodja
|-
! man
| biːn, ŋanbe || waḏi || mawun || ŋumbin || ŋumbin || ŋarga || bundu
|-
! woman
| maːɳin || dudju || ŋaːriŋga || djänga || bagali || giri || dɔdju
|-
! head
| waːlu || miläl || laŋga || waːlu || waːluŋ || waːlu || ŋalja
|-
! eye
| mil || guɽu || milwa || milo || mila || mila || guɽu
|-
! nose
| djirdji || mulja || djirdji || djirdji || djirdji || djirdji || djirdji
|-
! mouth
| gaɳɖalgudal || jira || lira, djawi || barara || lira || baraːrg || lira
|-
! tongue
| djulaṉ || ŋalana || djälaṉ || djälaṉ || djälaṉ || djälaɳ || djälaṉ
|-
! stomach
| ŋaːru || djuni || munda || munda || munda || madjula || munda
|-
! bone
| gudji || darga || gudji || gudji || gudji || gujuwan || juŋguɽu
|-
! blood
| nuŋu || jilgu || gjaːwili || guŋulu || ŋurinjin || guŋulu || jälju
|-
! kangaroo
| wandjiri || madjiri || djädji || djiːa || djiːa || djiːa || maɭu
|-
! opossum
| djämbidjin ||  || ŋungudi || ŋurgudi || djaŋana || ŋurgudi || mala
|-
! emu
| ganaŋandja ||  || wanjaru || wanjaru || ibaradu || ŋäɽin || 
|-
! crow
| waŋgan || djägilgäda || wangura || wagwag || wagwag || waŋgurinja || ganga
|-
! fly
| bunmuɽ || ŋurin || ŋurin, muru || ŋurin || ŋurin, gunama || gunuŋa || mɔŋu
|-
! sun
| bɽaŋu || banal || walur || gaŋirin || wulŋan || waŋgu || ŋeːlir
|-
! moon
| gilinman || rogaŋga || järŋan || djälaːɳ || djägilin || baɖaŋara || girindji
|-
! fire
| waɭu || waɽu || djawu || djawi || djawi || djawi, waɭu || waɽu
|-
! smoke
| duwi || ŋundjur || ŋundjur || djuŋgaɖ || djuŋgaɖ || djuŋgaidj || djänjuŋu
|-
! water
| ŋaba || galju || ŋaba || ŋaːwa || ŋaːwa || ŋogo || gabi, jura
|}

References

McConvell and Laughren (2004) "The Ngumpin–Yapa subgroup". In Claire Bowern & Harold Koch, Australian Languages: Classification and the Comparative Method. Amsterdam/Philadelphia: John Benjamins Publishing Company.

 
Indigenous Australian languages in the Northern Territory
Indigenous Australian languages in Western Australia